The Mittag-Leffler Institute is a mathematical research institute located in Djursholm, a suburb of Stockholm. It invites scholars to participate in half-year programs in specialized mathematical subjects. The Institute is run by the Royal Swedish Academy of Sciences on behalf of research societies representing all the Scandinavian countries.

The Institute's main building was originally the residence of Gösta Mittag-Leffler, who donated it along with his extensive mathematics library. At his death in 1927, however, Mittag-Leffler's fortune was insufficient to set up an active research institute, which began operation only in 1969 under the leadership of Lennart Carleson.

The journals Acta Mathematica and Arkiv för Matematik are published by the institute. For a number of years at the beginning of the 20th century, Mittag-Leffler's villa hosted a celebratory dinner for Nobel Prize laureates.

Notable visitors

Each year the institute invites the best mathematician in their fields to work on specific mathematical themes. Some notable past visitors include:

Louis Billera, Sy Friedman, John B. Garnett, Roger Heath-Brown, Sigurður Helgason, Helge Holden, Harry Kesten, Donald Knuth, George Lusztig, Paul Malliavin, Benoit Mandelbrot, Lynn Steen, André Weil, Srinivasa S.R. Varadhan, Jean-Christophe Yoccoz, Günter M. Ziegler, Kenneth Falconer.

External links

Official website

 
Mathematical institutes
Metropolitan Stockholm
Research institutes in Sweden